Story of a Life is the third posthumous compilation album released featuring Harry Chapin, released in 1999 (see 1999 in music). It was released as a box set containing 3 CDs and a 76-page booklet.

Track listing
Disc 1 (1:16:59):
 "Taxi" - 6:42
 "Someone Keeps Callin' My Name" - 2:53
 "Could You Put Your Light On, Please" - 4:30
 "Empty" - 2:58
 "Greyhound" - 5:39
 "Any Old Kind of Day" - 4:45
 "Sunday Morning Sunshine" - 3:50
 "Sniper" - 9:57
 "Better Place to Be" - 8:35
 "They Call Her Easy" - 4:03
 "Mr. Tanner" - 5:12
 "Mail Order Annie" - 4:54
 "W*O*L*D" - 5:12
 "Old College Avenue" - 4:27
 "Circle" - 3:22
Disc 2 (1:18:07):
 "Short Stories" - 4:35
 "Cat's in the Cradle" - 3:48
 "I Wanna Learn a Love Song" - 4:24
 "30,000 Pounds of Bananas (Live)" - 10:58
 "Shooting Star" - 4:06
 "What Made America Famous?" - 6:52
 "Vacancy" - 4:01
 "Dreams Go By" - 4:43
 "Tangled Up Puppet" - 3:42
 "The Rock" - 4:12
 "She is Always Seventeen" - 4:18
 "The Mayor of Candor Lied" - 8:21
 "Caroline" - 3:40
 "Laugh Man" - 3:35
 "Taxi (Live)" - 6:52
Disc 3 (1:18:26):
 "Corey's Coming" - 5:38
 "If My Mary Were Here" - 3:26
 "Dance Band on the Titanic" - 5:11
 "Mismatch" - 4:55
 "I Wonder What Happened to Him" - 4:09
 "Dancin' Boy" - 3:52
 "Flowers Are Red (Live)" - 5:07
 "Poor Damned Fool" - 4:34
 "Jenny" - 4:47
 "I Wonder What Would Happen to This World" - 3:29
 "Old Folkie (Live)" - 5:02
 "Remember When the Music (Reprise)" - 3:56
 "God Babe, You've Been Good for Me" - 3:23
 "Story of a Life" - 5:21
 "November Rains" - 3:50
 "Sequel" - 6:40
 "Last Stand" - 5:06

Personnel
Harry Chapin - guitar, vocals
Clair Marlo - Producer, arranger, synthesizer
Tom Chapin - guitar
Grant Geissman - guitar
Jon Corbert - piano
Steve Chapin - piano
Pat Coil - piano
Bill Lanphier - bass guitar
John Wallace - bass guitar
Howie Fields - drums and percussion
M. B. Gordy - drums and percussion
Doug Walker - electric guitar
Jon Corbert - synthesizer

References

1999 compilation albums
Harry Chapin albums
Compilation albums published posthumously
Elektra Records compilation albums